Kilkenny County Council is the authority responsible for local government in County Kilkenny, Ireland. As a county council, it is governed by the Local Government Act 2001. The council is responsible for housing and community, roads and transportation, urban planning and development, amenity and culture, and environment. The council has 24 elected members. Elections are held every five years and are by single transferable vote. The head of the council has the title of Cathaoirleach (Chairperson). The county administration is headed by a Chief Executive, Colette Byrne. The county town is Kilkenny city.

History
The county council originally met at Kilkenny Courthouse. By the second half of the 20th century it had moved to new offices at John's Green House. The county council moved to its current home, County Hall, in 1994.

In 2000, as part of a government initiative called "Better Local Government – A Programme for Change", a new structure was introduced to Kilkenny County Council which included five Strategic Policy Committees.

Local electoral areas and municipal districts
Kilkenny County Council is divided into the following municipal districts and local electoral areas, defined by electoral divisions.

Councillors
The following were elected at the 2019 Kilkenny County Council election, under the boundaries which existed at the time.

2019 seats summary

Councillors by electoral area
This list reflects the order in which councillors were elected on 24 May 2019.

Notes

Co-options

Changes in affiliation

References

Sources
Tom Boyle and Michael O'Dwyer. Kilkenny County Council: A Century of Local Government. Kilkenny: Kilkenny County Council, 1999.

External links

Politics of County Kilkenny
County councils in the Republic of Ireland